José Carlos Santos da Silva (born 19 March 1975), known as Zé Carlos, is a Brazilian retired footballer who played as a forward.

His own included, he played professionally in six countries.

Football career
Born in Ipirá, Bahia, Zé Carlos received the nickname Zé do Gol (Zé of the Goal) while playing at Botafogo de Futebol e Regatas. There, he was champion of the 1997 Campeonato Carioca and the Torneio Rio-São Paulo in the following year. In January 2002 he left for Turkish club Malatyaspor and, the next year, moved back to Brazil, for Clube de Regatas do Flamengo also in Rio de Janeiro.

In January 2004, Zé Carlos joined South Korea's Pohang Steelers. The following year in the same month he moved again, penning a one-year deal with Esporte Clube Juventude.

Zé Carlos spent the next one-and-a-half seasons in Portugal, with C.S. Marítimo and S.C. Braga, helping the Minho side finish fourth in 2006–07 and qualify for the UEFA Cup. He was also an essential attacking unit in their semi-final run in the Taça de Portugal, notably scoring a hat-trick in a 5–2 home win against Portimonense SC.

On 12 July 2007, Zé Carlos signed a contract with APOEL FC in Cyprus. He experienced some trouble with injuries during his stay, but helped his team win the domestic cup.

In 2011, 34-year-old Zé Carlos helped Club Bolívar conquer the Bolivian League, scoring ten goals. He subsequently returned to his country, playing exclusively in amateur football.

Honours
Botafogo
Campeonato Carioca: 1997

APOEL
Cypriot Cup: 2007–08

Bolívar
Liga de Fútbol Profesional Boliviano: 2011

References

External links
Brazilian FA database 

APOEL official profile 

1975 births
Living people
Sportspeople from Bahia
Brazilian footballers
Association football forwards
Campeonato Brasileiro Série A players
Campeonato Brasileiro Série B players
Atlético Clube Goianiense players
Botafogo de Futebol e Regatas players
Guarani FC players
CR Flamengo footballers
Esporte Clube Juventude players
Associação Botafogo Futebol Clube players
Ceilândia Esporte Clube players
Olaria Atlético Clube players
Süper Lig players
Malatyaspor footballers
K League 1 players
Pohang Steelers players
Primeira Liga players
C.S. Marítimo players
S.C. Braga players
C.D. Trofense players
Cypriot First Division players
APOEL FC players
Veria F.C. players
Bolivian Primera División players
Club Bolívar players
Brazilian expatriate footballers
Expatriate footballers in Turkey
Expatriate footballers in South Korea
Expatriate footballers in Portugal
Expatriate footballers in Cyprus
Expatriate footballers in Greece
Expatriate footballers in Bolivia
Brazilian expatriate sportspeople in Portugal
Brazilian expatriate sportspeople in Bolivia